Francavilla d'Ete is a comune (municipality) in the Province of Fermo in the Italian region Marche, located about  south of Ancona and about  north of Ascoli Piceno.

Francavilla d'Ete borders the following municipalities: Corridonia, Fermo, Mogliano, Monte San Pietrangeli, Montegiorgio.

References

Cities and towns in the Marche